Lyn Byl (born 1 December 1979 in Wuppertal, Germany) is a British handball player. Born in Germany, she has an English mother and plays for the British national team. She made her debut for Great Britain in 2008 and competed at the 2012 Summer Olympics. in London. She is a physiotherapist by profession but also coaches the women's team of 1.FC Köln.

References

External links

1979 births
Living people
British female handball players
Handball players at the 2012 Summer Olympics
Olympic handball players of Great Britain
Sportspeople from Wuppertal
German people of English descent
British physiotherapists